John Franklin Baker Jr. (October 30, 1945 – January 20, 2012) was a United States Army Master Sergeant who served in the Vietnam War and a recipient of the Medal of Honor.

Personal life
Baker was born in Davenport, Iowa, and attended Moline High School from 1963 to 1966. At 5' 1", he was a gymnast before joining the army. He became a "tunnel rat" in Vietnam, a soldier who entered Viet Cong tunnels searching out the enemy and destroying their caches of war material. Baker made the military his career, retiring in 1989. He then began working as a computer analyst at a Veterans Hospital in South Carolina. In addition to serving as the Vice-President of the Congressional Medal of Honor Society, he served as a member on the Nation's Monuments and Cemeteries Committee.

In 2008, the I-280 Bridge, connecting Davenport, Iowa with Rock Island, Illinois, was renamed the Sergeant John F. Baker Jr. Bridge in his honor.

In 2018, the Rock Island Arsenal in Rock Island, Illinois put his name on a street in its new Eagle Point Housing Area. 

Baker suffered from heart problems in the last years of his life and began using oxygen in 2010. He died aged 66 on January 20, 2012, after collapsing at his Northeast Richland home.

Career

Baker entered the U.S. Army in Moline, Illinois, serving as a private in A Company, 2nd Battalion of the 27th Infantry Regiment, 25th Division. In Vietnam, he took part in Operation Attleboro which began in September 1966. On November 5, 1966, Baker and his unit were called to assist another squad who were taking enemy fire. En route, A Company began to take fire and lost their lead soldier. Together with two other soldiers, Baker took over the head of the column and assisted in destroying two enemy positions. They were moving to take two others when a hand grenade knocked Baker off his feet.

With the two other soldiers wounded, Baker "single handedly" destroyed another bunker before recovering his comrades. Despite taking further fire from enemy bunkers and snipers, he continually fell back to replenish ammunition and take back several wounded. For these actions, he was awarded the Medal of Honor along with Captain Robert F. Foley, who also received the Medal of Honor for his actions in the battle. When awarding the medal, President Lyndon B Johnson stated:

Decorations

  Medal of Honor
  Silver Star
  Legion of Merit
  Bronze Star
  Purple Heart

Medal of Honor citation
Rank and organization: Sergeant (then Pfc.), U.S. Army, Company A, 2d Battalion, 27th Infantry, 25th Infantry Division. Place and date: Republic of Vietnam, November 5, 1966. Entered service at: Moline, Ill. Born: October 30, 1945, Davenport, Iowa.

Citation:

See also

List of Medal of Honor recipients for the Vietnam War

References

External links

1945 births
2012 deaths
United States Army Medal of Honor recipients
Recipients of the Silver Star
Recipients of the Legion of Merit
United States Army personnel of the Vietnam War
United States Army non-commissioned officers
People from Davenport, Iowa
People from Columbia, South Carolina
Vietnam War recipients of the Medal of Honor
Iowa Republicans
Burials_at_Arlington_National_Cemetery
Recipients of the Order of Saint Maurice